In shogi, Fourth File Rook (四間飛車 shikenbisha) is a class of Ranging Rook openings in which the rook is initially positioned on the fourth file if played by White or the sixth file if played by Black.

History

The earliest recorded shogi game was a Static Rook vs. Fourth File Rook game from 1607. Black was  who played a Right Fourth File Rook position (Static Rook) against Sansa Hon'inbō's Fourth File Rook. Ōhashi won the game.

Fourth File Rook vs Static Rook

Normal Fourth File Rook

The opening starts by the usual 4-move sequence that characterizes Static Rook vs Ranging Rook games as shown in the first adjacent board position. (See: Normal Ranging Rook.)

Fujii System

The Fujii System is a set of Fourth File Rook strategies used against various Static Rook strategies (mainly Left Mino and Bear-in-the-hole Static Rook).

vs Rapid Attack

Tateishi Fourth File Rook

A Fourth File Rook opening created by amateur player Katsuki Tateishi, which awarded him the prestigious Kōzō Masuda Award in 2004.

Bear-in-the-hole Fourth File Rook

King's Head Silver

King's Head Silver (玉頭銀) is a Fourth File Rook opening characterized by the left silver moving to 56, 45, and then to 34. There are versions for both quick fights and slow games.

vs King's Head Vanguard Pawn

Fourth File Rook against Black's King's Head Vanguard Pawn (玉頭位取り gyokutou kuraidori).

vs Iijima Bishop Pullback

Bishop-Exchange Fourth File Rook

The Bishop-Exchange Fourth File is a Fourth File Rook opening in which the player's bishop diagonal remains open allowing for a bishop exchange to occur early in the opening.

Leghorn Special

The Leghorn Special (白色レグホン・スペシャル hakushoku reguhon supesharu or, most commonly, the abbreviation レグスペ regusupe) is an opening in which you build up a Bear-in-the-hole castle while you're simultaneously defending against an opponent's Bear-in-the-hole. It is a Bear-in-the-hole Bishop Exchange Fourth File Rook variation and is also famous as an opening to discourage Black from building of a Bear-in-the-hole. The name is said to have originated in the resemblance of this opening to the behavior of a white leghorn chicken that keeps attacking when surrounded by Bear-in-the-hole.

The leghorn special consists mainly in castling the king in Bear-in-the-hole once the bishops have been exchanged in Fourth File Rook. It requires that the opponent is playing Static Rook, and that you're playing White. Following Black's K-68, White would go for the bishop exchange (Bx88), which leads to Black's Sx88, hence reducing the escape routes of Black's king and interfering with Black's castle formation. So, the Leghorn Special prevents (or at least slows down) Black's Bear-in-the-hole, while White can devote to building its own Bear-in-the-hole without problem.

Fourth File Rook in Double Ranging Rook

Fourth File Rook positions are not often used in Double Ranging Rook games in professional play. When they are used, the positions often transition to Opposing Rook positions.

See also

 Left Silver-5g Rapid Attack
 Fujii System
 Right Fourth File Rook vs Fourth File Rook
 Bishop Exchange Fourth File Rook
 Tateishi Fourth File Rook
 Ranging Rook

Notes

References

Bibliography

External links

 How to Defend in Shogi: Basic Formation 3: Shikenbisha
 YouTube: HIDETCHI's Shogi Openings:
 S6-5g Rapid Attack (against 4th-file Mino Defense)
 Left S-4f Strategy #1
 Left S-4f Strategy #2
 Left S-4f Strategy #3
 Left S-4f Strategy #4 (P*3f variation)
 Left S-4f Strategy #5 (P*3g variation)
 Left S-4f Strategy #6 (B-2b variation)
 P-4e Rapid Engage #1
 P-4e Rapid Engage #2
 P-4e Rapid Engage #3
 Shogi Shack:
 The First Example: Ibisya And Furibishya
 Fourth File Ranging Rook
 Playing Fourth Rile Rook Against Right Fourth Ranging Rook
 Shogi Opening: 4th File Rook vs Akutsu Semi Rapid Attack
 Yet Another Shogi Site: Basics of Gote Fourth File Rook

Shogi openings
Ranging Rook openings
Fourth File Rook openings